White Sands: Experiences from the Outside World is a 2016 travel book written by Geoff Dyer. The book was previously titled White Sands. The writer described the book as a mixture of fiction and non-fiction. The book's narration begins in Tahiti.  White Sands, is a collection of travel-related essays, short stories, photographs and vignettes.

References

2015 non-fiction books
Travel books
Books about Oceania
Tourism in French Polynesia
Pantheon Books books